Year 237 (CCXXXVII) was a common year starting on Sunday (link will display the full calendar) of the Julian calendar. At the time, it was known as the Year of the Consulship of Perpetuus and Felix (or, less frequently, year 990 Ab urbe condita). The denomination 237 for this year has been used since the early medieval period, when the Anno Domini calendar era became the prevalent method in Europe for naming years.

Events 
 By place 

 Roman Empire 
 Emperor Maximinus Thrax campaigns on the rivers Danube and Rhine in Germania, defeating the Alemanni, and never visits Rome. He is accepted by the Roman Senate, but taxes the rich aristocracy heavily, and engenders such hostility among them, that they plot against him.

 Persia 
 King Ardashir I of Persia renews his attacks on the Roman province of Mesopotamia.

 By topic 

 Religion 
 Patriarch Eugenius I succeeds Patriarch Castinus as Patriarch of Constantinople.
 Saint Babylas becomes Patriarch of Antioch.

Births 
 Alexander of Constantinople, patriarch of Constantinople
 Guo Huai  (or Yuhuang), Chinese noblewoman (d. 296)
 Philip II (the Younger), Roman emperor (d. 249)

Deaths 
 February 7 – Chen Qun, Chinese official and politician
 September 22 – Mingdao (or Mao), Chinese empress
 Wu Yi (or Ziyuan), Chinese general of the Shu Han state
 Zhang (or Jing'ai), Chinese empress of the Shu Han state

References